Mix camp (also: Berghoff settlement) is an informal settlement in the greater Brakwater area in central Namibia. By 2021 it had grown to 1,454 households. Mix camp belongs to the Windhoek Rural electoral constituency.

Mix camp is named after German Heiner Mix who allowed people to settle on his  plot in the 1980s. After Mix' death in 1999 the settlement mushroomed because there was no landlord. In 2006 a lengthy legal and political battle started after a company owned by Secretary to Namibian Cabinet Frans Kapofi bought the plot and wanted the residents to leave. Mix residents in turn requested government to expropriate the land. 

In November 2010, two weeks before the regional elections, government acquired the land and promised to develop the area. In the early 2020s plans to formalize and develop the settlement were made public. Among the planned improvements are the provision of water and sanitation and the establishment of a clinic and a police station.

References

Populated places in the Khomas Region
Shanty towns in Namibia
Windhoek